The London Gardens Trust (formally, London Historic Parks & Gardens Trust) is a charity based in London, England. It is an independent charity and one of the county garden trusts operating under the Gardens Trust.

The Trust aims to increase knowledge and appreciation of parks, squares, community gardens, cemeteries and churchyards in London. It was launched at the Chelsea Flower Show in May 1994. Its headquarters are at Duck Island Cottage in St. James's Park, central London. The Trust organises lectures, walks, guided visits, study days, the annual Open Garden Squares Weekend, and research.

Its website, London Gardens Online, provides information on over 2,500 "parks, gardens, squares, churchyards, cemeteries and other sites of historic interest across the whole of London."

See also
Yorkshire Gardens Trust

References 

1994 establishments in England
Charities based in London
Organizations established in 1994
Parks and open spaces in London